Bogside is a hamlet 2 miles north-east of Wishaw in North Lanarkshire, Scotland, on the border of South Lanarkshire.

The hamlet is situated on two main roads, A73 and A721, so many of Central Scotland's communities can be accessed from there. It contains only a few houses, and a motorstore.

Notable people
Daniel Rankin Steuart lived at 11 Melville Crescent in Edinburgh's West End.

References

External links 

Bogside on Google Maps

Villages in North Lanarkshire
Wishaw